The 2002 Checker Auto Parts 500 presented by Pennzoil was the 35th stock car race of the 2002 NASCAR Winston Cup Series and the 15th iteration of the event. The race was held on Sunday, November 10, 2002, before a crowd of 100,000 in Avondale, Arizona at Phoenix International Raceway, a 1-mile (1.6 km) permanent low-banked tri-oval race track. The race took the scheduled 312 laps to complete. At race's end, Matt Kenseth, driving for Roush Racing, would pull off a clutch two-tire strategy on the final restart of the race to win his fifth career NASCAR Winston Cup Series win and his fourth of the season. To fill out the podium, Rusty Wallace of Penske Racing and Jeff Gordon of Hendrick Motorsports would finish second and third, respectively.

Background 

Phoenix International Raceway – also known as PIR – is a one-mile, low-banked tri-oval race track located in Avondale, Arizona. It is named after the nearby metropolitan area of Phoenix. The motorsport track opened in 1964 and currently hosts two NASCAR race weekends annually. PIR has also hosted the IndyCar Series, CART, USAC and the Rolex Sports Car Series. The raceway is currently owned and operated by International Speedway Corporation.

The raceway was originally constructed with a 2.5 mi (4.0 km) road course that ran both inside and outside of the main tri-oval. In 1991 the track was reconfigured with the current 1.51 mi (2.43 km) interior layout. PIR has an estimated grandstand seating capacity of around 67,000. Lights were installed around the track in 2004 following the addition of a second annual NASCAR race weekend.

Entry list 

 (R) denotes rookie driver.

*Withdrew. Harmon would withdraw after crashing during practice, and Hooper would withdraw after crashing in practice.

Practice

First practice 
The first practice session was held on Friday, November 8, at 10:30 AM MST, and would last for 2 hours.

Second practice 
The second practice session was held on Saturday, November 9, at 8:30 AM MST, and would last for 45 minutes.

Third and final practice 
The third and final practice session, sometimes referred to as Happy Hour, was held on Saturday, November 9, at 10:15 AM MST, and would last for 45 minutes.

Qualifying 
Qualifying was held on Friday, November 8, at 3:05 PM MST. Each driver would have two laps to set a fastest time; the fastest of the two would count as their official qualifying lap. Positions 1-36 would be decided on time, while positions 37-43 would be based on provisionals. Six spots are awarded by the use of provisionals based on owner's points. The seventh is awarded to a past champion who has not otherwise qualified for the race. If no past champion needs the provisional, the next team in the owner points will be awarded a provisional.

Six drivers would fail to qualify: Ted Musgrave, Jack Sprague, Brett Bodine, Jerry Robertson, Morgan Shepherd, and Jeff Jefferson.

Full qualifying results

Race results

References 

2002 NASCAR Winston Cup Series
NASCAR races at Phoenix Raceway
November 2002 sports events in the United States
2002 in sports in Arizona